Westermann may refer to:
 Westermann, family name
 Westermann Verlag, German publishing house
 Westermanns Monatshefte, German periodical

See also
Westerman